Tillandsia sphaerocephala is a species of flowering plant in the family Bromeliaceae. This species is native to Bolivia.

References

sphaerocephala
Flora of Bolivia
Taxa named by John Gilbert Baker